George Forrest (July 21, 1904 – May 22, 1986) was a Scottish football (soccer) player who played for the Canada men's national soccer team.

Club career
Forrest began his career with Scotland with Heart of Midlothian and Alloa Athletic. After spending a year in Canada with Toronto Ulster United, in 1924 he signed with Bethlehem Steel of the American Soccer League. He played two seasons with Bethlehem, but was released following the 1925–26 season. He returned to Canada where he briefly played again for Ulster. In September 1926, Bethlehem brought him back into the team for a third season. He then played for several clubs in England and Scotland over the next eight years.

National team
Forrest played for Canada in their 1924 tour of Australia and New Zealand: In six games against Australia, Forrest scored twice as the Canadians split the series at two wins a piece. He played in Canada's first official match on June 7, 1924, against Australia, where he also scored Canada's second-ever goal. A week later Canada drew with New Zealand 1–1 in Auckland.

References

External links
Bethelem Steel Soccer Team Biographies with a photo of Forrest

1904 births
1986 deaths
American Soccer League (1921–1933) players
Bethlehem Steel F.C. (1907–1930) players
Canadian expatriate sportspeople in the United States
Canadian expatriate soccer players
Canada men's international soccer players
Canadian soccer players
Expatriate soccer players in the United States
Footballers from East Lothian
Heart of Midlothian F.C. players
Alloa Athletic F.C. players
St Bernard's F.C. players
Raith Rovers F.C. players
Peterhead F.C. players
Toronto Ulster United players
Plymouth Argyle F.C. players
Scottish expatriate footballers
Scottish expatriate sportspeople in the United States
Scottish footballers
Scottish Football League players
English Football League players
Scottish emigrants to Canada
Association football inside forwards
People from Wallyford